William Anthony Bartee (born June 25, 1977) is a former American football cornerback in the National Football League. He played his entire career for the Kansas City Chiefs.  He spent two years at the University of Oklahoma after beginning his college career at Butler County Community College in El Dorado, Kansas.  He totaled 60 tackles, two interceptions, two fumble recoveries, 2 forced fumbles, 7 tackles for loss, 12 passes defensed and 1 sack.  He was drafted in the 2000 NFL Draft by Kansas City. Before the 2006 season, the Chiefs signed Ty Law, so William Bartee agreed to change his number from 24 to 21.

Bartee missed the entire 2006 season due to injury and was placed on the PUP list in November. He was released by the Chiefs after the season.

NFL stats

References

External links
NFL.com player page

1977 births
Living people
American football cornerbacks
American football safeties
Butler Grizzlies football players
Kansas City Chiefs players
Oklahoma Sooners football players
Sportspeople from Daytona Beach, Florida
Players of American football from Florida